Valérie Ndakom Ndeidoum (born July 14, 1981 in N'Djamena) is a retired Chadian goalkeeper.

Career
The goalkeeper played for Tourbillon and Gazelle FC in the Chadian Premier League and for Delta Téléstar Gabon Télécom FC in the Gabon Championnat National D1. He finished his career in Renaissance FC.

International career
He has played for the Chad national football team. He was the part of 2006 and 2010 FIFA World Cup qualifiers and 2012 Africa Cup of Nations qualifiers. He played for the side the finished runners-up at the 2005 CEMAC Cup.

References

External links

1981 births
Living people
Chadian footballers
Chad international footballers
Chadian expatriate footballers
Chadian expatriate sportspeople in Gabon
Expatriate footballers in Gabon
Delta Téléstar players
People from N'Djamena
Association football goalkeepers